SS Arabutan was the fifth Brazilian merchant ship to be sunk during World War II. At 21.10 hours on 7 March 1942, the German submarine  fired a stern torpedo that hit the Arabutan (Master Aníbal Alfredo do Prado) after 102 seconds and caused her to sink in 13 minutes about 81 miles off Cape Hatteras, at 35.15N/73.55W.

The ship had been spotted one hour earlier but no neutrality markings were noticed. One crew member, the nurse Manoel Florêncio Coimbra was lost, he probably was killed by the explosion while sleeping in his cabin. The master, 50 crew members, three sailors from the Brazilian tanker Itamarati and a survivor from Buarque abandoned ship in four lifeboats which were sighted about six hours later by aircraft. On 8 March, the US Coast Guard cutter  picked up the survivors and landed them at Little Creek, Virginia after sinking their boats as a hazard to navigation.

References

Bibliography
 Sander, Roberto. O Brasil na mira de Hitler: a história do afundamento de navios brasileiros pelos nazistas. Rio de Janeiro: Objetiva, 2007.
 Wynn, Kenneth G. U-Boat Operations of the Second World War Volume 2: Career Histories. United States Naval Inst Press, 1998

1917 ships
Standard World War I ships
Ships built in the San Francisco Bay Area
World War II merchant ships of Brazil
World War I merchant ships of the United Kingdom
Merchant ships of Brazil
Merchant ships of Italy
Merchant ships of the United Kingdom
Ships sunk by German submarines in World War II
Maritime incidents in March 1942
World War II shipwrecks in the Atlantic Ocean